was a Japanese-American actor, credited mononymously in almost all of his acting roles as simply Mako.

His role as Po-Han (his second credited role on film) in The Sand Pebbles (1966) saw him nominated for the Academy Award for Best Supporting Actor. Other various roles included Oomiak "The Fearless One" in The Island at the Top of the World (1974), Akiro the Wizard in Conan the Barbarian (1982) and Conan the Destroyer (1984), and Kungo Tsarong in Seven Years in Tibet (1997). He was part of the original cast of Stephen Sondheim's 1976 Broadway musical Pacific Overtures, which earned him a Tony Award nomination for Best Actor in a Musical. He was also one of the founding members of East West Players.

Later in his career, he became well known for his voice acting roles, including Aku in the first four seasons of Samurai Jack (2001–2004), and Iroh in the first two seasons of Avatar: The Last Airbender (2005–2006). He died on July 21, 2006 at the age of 72 from esophageal cancer.

Early life
Mako was born Makoto Iwamatsu in Kobe, Japan, the son of children's authors and illustrators Tomoe Sasako and Atsushi Iwamatsu. In 1939, his parents, who were political dissidents, moved to the United States, leaving Mako in the care of his grandmother. Because his parents lived on the East Coast, they were not interned during the Second World War; instead they opted to work for the U.S. Office of War Information and were later granted residency. His parents were able to arrange for him to join them in 1949, after which he studied architecture. Mako later enlisted in the United States Army in November 1953 and served until October 1955. He was in Korea and Japan with the Special Services division performing in plays for his fellow soldiers. He then became a naturalized U.S. citizen in 1956. It was during his military service that Mako discovered his theatrical talent; he then trained at the Pasadena Community Playhouse.

Career

Film
Mako's first film role was in Never So Few (1959). He was nominated for an Academy Award for Best Supporting Actor for his role as engine-room worker Po-Han in the film The Sand Pebbles (1966). Other roles include the Chinese contract laborer Mun Ki in the epic movie The Hawaiians (1970) starring Charlton Heston and Tina Chen; Oomiak, the Inuit guide, in Disney's The Island at the Top of the World (1974); Yuen Chung in the film The Killer Elite (1975) directed by Sam Peckinpah and starring James Caan, Robert Duvall, and the martial artist Takayuki Kubota; the sorcerer Nakano in Highlander III: The Sorcerer; Jackie Chan's uncle/sifu in Chan's first American movie The Big Brawl (1980); the wizard Akiro opposite Arnold Schwarzenegger in the two Conan movies Conan the Barbarian and Conan the Destroyer; the confidant to Chuck Norris' rogue cop in the thriller An Eye for an Eye (1982); the Japanese spy in the comedy Under the Rainbow.  In 1990, he had a minor role in the psychological thriller Pacific Heights along with Matthew Modine, Melanie Griffith and Michael Keaton; Yoshida-san in Rising Sun; Mr. Lee in Sidekicks; Kanemitsu in RoboCop 3 (1993); and Kungo Tsarong in Seven Years in Tibet (1997).

He also appeared in some Japanese television dramas and films, such as Masahiro Shinoda's Owls' Castle and Takashi Miike's The Bird People in China.

Mako was cast as the historic Admiral Isoroku Yamamoto in the epic drama Pearl Harbor (2001). He also had a role in Bulletproof Monk (2003). In 2005, Mako had a cameo role in Memoirs of a Geisha. Mako's last leading role was in the film Cages (2005), written and directed by Graham Streeter.

Theater
In 1965, frustrated by the limited roles available to himself and other Asian-American actors, Mako and six others formed the East West Players theater company, first performing out of a church basement. During the company's 1981 season, to coincide with the Commission on Wartime Relocation and Internment of Civilians' hearings on redress, Mako exclusively produced plays about the Japanese American incarceration. He remained artistic director of the company until 1989.

Mako's Broadway career included creating the roles of the Reciter, the shōgun, and the Chicago-based inventor of the rickshaw, in the original 1976 production of Stephen Sondheim's Broadway musical Pacific Overtures, for which he was nominated for a Tony Award for Best Leading Actor in a Musical.  Mako's landlord at the time, Jerry Orbach, was also nominated for his role in Chicago; both lost, however, to George Rose from the revival of My Fair Lady. Mako recalled being awoken at 4:30 in the morning after the Tony ceremony by Orbach, who was shouting from the floor below: "Hey, Mako! What the fuck happened? I can't believe it; we lost to a fucking revival!". Mako reprised the role and directed the musical's production with the East West Players, and further reprised the role in a production at the San Jose Civic Light Opera in 1991. He also starred in the limited run of the play Shimada in 1992.

Television
Mako appeared on the television series McHale's Navy several times, playing Imperial Japanese officers, soldiers and sailors. In 1965, he appeared on Gidget as a member of a rival surf group. He later appeared on the television series M*A*S*H, playing multiple roles such as a Chinese doctor, a North Korean soldier, a South Korean medical doctor and a South Korean lieutenant. He appeared in an episode of the series The Time Tunnel as Lt. Nakamura in 1967.  He appeared in an episode of the series Kung Fu as Wong Ti Lu in 1972. In 1974, he appeared in the Ironside episode "Terror on Grant Avenue". He appeared as a Japanese chef in the Columbo episode "Murder Under Glass" (1978). He was the blind philosopher Li Sung in two episodes of The Incredible Hulk. He also appeared on an episode of Magnum, P.I. entitled "The Arrow That Is Not Aimed" (1983). Mako also appeared in an episode of F Troop. He appeared as Lo Sing, fighting Bruce Lee's Kato character in The Green Hornet episode "The Preying Mantis". He played the character Lin Duk Coo in an episode of The A-Team. He guest-starred in an episode of season one of Frasier as well as in an episode of Tour of Duty as a Vietnamese scout. He also was a guest star in the Monk episode "Mr. Monk vs. The Cobra". He guest-starred in the Walker, Texas Ranger episodes "Heart of the Dragon" (1997) and "Black Dragons" (2000), and appeared on Charmed in 2003, creating magic for Chris (played by Drew Fuller).

He was the voice of Aku, the main antagonist in the animated series Samurai Jack for the first four seasons produced from 2001 to 2004, and again in the series finale which used his original audio. He also voiced Achoo (a parody of Aku) and the annoying alarm clock Happy Cat in a Samurai Jack-parodying episode of Duck Dodgers entitled "Samurai Quack". He provided the introductory voice for the ending theme of Dexter's Laboratory and portrayed the popular character Iroh in the first two seasons of Avatar: The Last Airbender from 2005 to 2006. He had a guest appearance in the Nickelodeon movie Rugrats in Paris: The Movie as the boss of Coco. He guest-starred in The West Wing episode "A Good Day" as an economics professor and former rival of President Bartlet. He was also featured in Season 3 Episode 13 of The Facts of Life, entitled "The Americanization of Miko".

Video games
Mako made his video game debut with the role of the goblin Grubjub in Lionheart: Legacy of the Crusader (2003). In the same year, he also voiced General Han Yu Kim in True Crime: Streets of LA, Masataka Shima in Medal of Honor: Rising Sun, and various voices in Secret Weapons Over Normandy. In 2004, Mako voiced the narrator in the game Wrath Unleashed, and Aku in Samurai Jack: The Shadow of Aku.

Personal life
Mako was married to actress Shizuko Hoshi, with whom he had two daughters (both of whom are actresses) and three grandchildren.

Death
Mako died in Somis, California, on July 21, 2006, at the age of 72, from esophageal cancer. One day before his death, Mako had been confirmed to star in the film TMNT as the voice of Splinter. Kevin Munroe, director of the film, confirmed that Mako had completed his recording. The producers dedicated the finished film to Mako.

In the Avatar: The Last Airbender episode "The Tales of Ba Sing Se", the segment titled "The Tale of Iroh" was created "in honor of Mako", the voice actor for Iroh for the first two seasons: Book One: Water and Book Two: Earth. In the sequel series The Legend of Korra, a lead male character, Mako, was named after him (voiced by David Faustino).

After Mako's death, some of his roles, particularly Aku from Samurai Jack and Iroh in Avatar: The Last Airbender and The Legend of Korra, were taken over by American voice actor Greg Baldwin.

Filmography

Film

Television

Video games

References

External links

A 1998 interview about Pacific Overtures

1933 births
2006 deaths
20th-century American dramatists and playwrights
20th-century American male actors
Actors from Kobe
American male dramatists and playwrights
American dramatists and playwrights of Japanese descent
American male actors of Japanese descent
American male film actors
American male television actors
American male voice actors
American military personnel of Japanese descent
American theatre directors of Japanese descent
American film actors of Asian descent
Deaths from cancer in California
Deaths from esophageal cancer
Japanese emigrants to the United States
Japanese male film actors
Japanese male stage actors
Japanese male voice actors
Male voice actors from Kobe
Naturalized citizens of the United States
United States Army soldiers